The Castleford Male Voice Choir (CMVC) is a male voice choir based in Castleford, West Yorkshire, England. The choir was established in 1926.

The choir has recorded LPs. It has appeared on the BBC television programme The One Show. It has toured nationally and internationally, for example to Salzburg in Austria where it appeared with the Salzburg Singers. The choir undertakes joint concerts as well as appearing on its own.

The Castleford MVC meets weekly at the Trinity Methodist Church Hall in Castleford.

Discography
Recordings include:

 Golden Jubilee (1975)
 Yorkshire Mixture (1978) – with the Queensbury Music Centre Band
 With A Voice Of Singing (2001)

References

External links
 Castleford Male Voice Choir website
 
 Castleford Male Voice Choir on YouTube

1926 establishments in England
Musical groups established in 1926
Boys' and men's choirs
Yorkshire choirs
Musical groups from West Yorkshire
Castleford